Catalana sandrangato is a moth of the  family Noctuidae. It was described by Viette in 1961. It is found on Madagascar.

References

Moths described in 1961
Calpinae